Felix Ugo Omokhodion (born 27 April 1986) is a Nigerian actor, model and filmmaker. He is best known for his role in the 2006 Tajudeen Adepetu produced television series One Love, as well as his portrayal of the character Tubosun in the movie Celebrity Marriage, which also co-starred Tonto Dikeh, Jackie Appiah, Kanayo O Kanayo, Odunlade Adekola, Toyin Abraham and Roselyn Ngissah, for which he was nominated as Best Supporting Actor Male at the Zulu African Film Academy Awards 2018, which held  in the United Kingdom.

Early life
Omokhodion was born in Lagos Island, Nigeria on 27 April 1986. He was born to a Flight Captain father, Felix Omokhodion from Edo State and his mother Victoria Obiageli Nwughala from Imo State. At the age of three, his parents separated and he grew up with his mother in a single parent home. He is the first child of his father and the only child of his mother. Omokhodion had his primary school education at M&K Nursery and Primary School, Ojodu Lagos, during which time he had begun to show interest in acting and show business, as he would often act out roles with imaginary cast members, while in school.  Omokhodion Studied Computer Science at the Lagos State University, Ojo Lagos and went on to study Method Acting at Lees Strasberg Film Institute Los Angeles, CA.

Career
While at the University, Omokhodion began his modelling career and took part in campaigns for Coca- Cola, Haier Thermocool, MTN, and a few other notable Nigerian brands.  He got his first screen role as an extra in a Movie Love In Totality, starring Yomi Black and Omotola Jalade Ekeinde. In 2006, Omokhodion attended an audition for a role on a new AIT Television series titled One Love produced by Tajudeen Adepetu and he was cast in his first major role as "Biodun", a role which he went on to play for seven years alongside Tony Umole, Vivian Anani and Joshua Richard.

Omokhodion went on to play prominent roles in other television series including The Maze directed by Acho Yusuf, Bella's Place Produced by Deborah Odutayo, Portraits of Passion co-starring Blossom Chukwujekwu, Emerald produced by Dapo Ojo, Thirty Minutes Produced by Dapo Ojo and written by Biodun Stephen, Super Story's Corporate Thieves Produced by Wale Adenuga of WAP TV, EbonyLife's Short Series Madam Sarah's House Produced by Mo Abudu, and NECTAR Produced by Sola Sobowale.

In 2016, after a decade of starring predominantly in television series, Omokhodion began starring in full-length feature films, which began with the 2016 movie, The Engagement.  He went on to feature in other notable films including the successful Box office hit, Celebrity Marriage. His portrayal of the character James in the movie Things I Hate About You co-starring Jackie Appiah, Calista Okorokwo got him nominated in the category of Best Actor African Movie Collaboration in the 2018 edition of the Ghana Movie Awards.

In February 2020, Omokhodion released his debut feature film production on his newly launched film production company, FPF Productions titled Muddled in cinemas across Nigeria. The movie starred several notable Nigerian actors including Kunle Remi and Belinda Effah and was directed by Best Okoduwa

Awards and recognition

Filmography

Television series

Feature films

2016 - Lead role- The Engagement directed by Ubong Bassi
2016 - Lead role - My Love Alive directed by Chinedu Ben
2016 - James(Lead role) - Things I hate About You directed by Pascal Amanfo
2017 - Desmond(Lead role) - Women directed by Chidox
2017 - Lead role - Inner Enemy directed by Wilson Chibututu
2017 - Justin(Lead Role) - Strange Affection directed by Ubong Bassey Nya
2017 - Lead Role - Secret Safe With Me directed by Innocent Chukwuma(One soul)
2017 - Detective(Sub lead) - Bad Market directed by Innocent Chukwuma(One soul)
2017 - Sub Lead - Therapist's Therapy directed by Innocent Chukwuma(One soul)
2017 - Lead- Subterfuge directed by Cyril Jackson for Iroko tv
2017 - Lead(Tubosun) - Celebrity Marriage directed by Pascal Amanfo
2017 - Detective - The Quest directed by dimeji Ajibola
2017 - Lawyer(Lead Role)- The Code directed by Cyril Jackson
2017 - Mbaka- The Chronicles directed by Caliph Uzar
2017 - Doctor - The Monitor directed by Izzy Films
2017 - Sub Lead - Prodigal Daughters directed by Victor Okpala
2018 - Cameo - Dark Chronicles directed by Best Okoduwa
2018 - Sub lead - Desures and Deceit directed by Uche Okereke
2018 - Sub Lead - Till Mum's Do Us Part directed by Ubong Bassey Nya
2018 - Lead - Dead Silent directed by Anara Nnachi
2018 - Sub lead - Second Woman directed by Richards OmosIboyi DGN (Lionhills movies)
2018 - Lead - House 69 directed by Emma Anyaka
2018 - Lead - Lucky Number One directed by Chidox
2018 - Lead - Inferior directed by sunshibe Olawore
2018 - Lead - Smooth Operator directed by Ubong bassey Nya
2018 - Lead - Wasted directed by Emma Olabode
2018 - Lead - Longest Day directed by Prince Iyke Olisa
2018 - Lead - 24hrs to My Wedding directed by Emma Olabode
2018 - Lead - Because I Loved You directed by Ndifreke Mathew Andy
2018 - Nonso(Sub-Lead) - A Fighting Chance directed by Bishop Nwabunze
2018 - Sub-Lead - ARABELLA directed by Chinonso Aniebonam
2018 - Sub Lead - KARENS FLaWS directed by Uchechi Okereke
2018 - Samuel(Lead) - What A Woman Wants directed by Emma Olabode
2018 - Prince Rappor(Lead) -ATEMA directed by Simi Opeoluwa
2018 - Sub Lead - Secret Twins directed by Emma Anyaka
2018 - Lead - Truce Directed by Chuks Ejiofor
2018 - Lead - Untold directed by foa films
2018 - Lead - Lisa's Code directed by Paul Igwe
2018 - Izu - Unfriendly directed by Uche Okereke
2018 - Lead - Shaded Night directed by Femi Despy Akinlosotu
2018 - Lead - Amoral directed by Paul Igwe
2018 - Lead - Sade directed by Sunshine Olawore
2019 - Desmond(Lead)- Intimacy directed by sunshine olawore
2019 - Lead - Ruby directed by Chidox
2019 - Lead - Random Hearts directed by Chidox
2019 - Lead -Ray Of Hope directed by Sadiq Sule
2019 - Cameo - A Trap Inbetween directed by Uchechi Okereke
2019 - Sub Lead - A Step Downwards directed by aderick media
2019 - Lead - Power Of Virtue directed by Bigstan Okoro
2019 - Lead - Envisage directed by Chinonso Charles
2019 - Lead - Ocean Of Tears directed by sunshine olawore
2019 - Debo (Sub Lead) - Shola's Diaries directed by Yinka Sam- aina
2019 - Lead - HellMary directed by paul igwe
2019 - Victor(Lead) - Killing Victors Wife directed by eric aghimien
2019 - Lead - THORN APART directed by Chuks Ejiofor
2019 - Ifeanyi - Final Destination directed by Sesan Alabi

References 

Nigerian male film actors
Nigerian male television actors
1986 births
Living people
Nigerian male models
Lagos State University alumni
Male actors from Lagos
Models from Lagos
Filmmakers from Lagos
Actors from Edo State
Nigerian filmmakers
People from Edo State
Lee Strasberg Theatre and Film Institute alumni
21st-century Nigerian male actors